Ahasverus Samuel "Asser" van Nierop (24 January 1813 – 15 May 1878) was a Dutch Jewish jurist, politician and member of parliament.

Biography
Van Nierop studied law at the Amsterdam Athenæum and received a Doctor of Law degree from Leiden University in 1839. He established himself as a prominent lawyer in Amsterdam, where he advocated for synagogue reform in the 1840s.

In 1851 he was elected member of the House of Representatives, but failed to secure reelection in 1853. He returned as a representative for the Haarlem district between 1864 and 1866. In 1870 he was elected member of the Amsterdam Municipal Council and in 1875 member of the Provincial Council of North Holland.

Nierop was president of the Centrale Commissie and of the Permanente Commissie, in which capacity he did much for the Jews in Holland, and served on the Nederlands Israëlitisch Kerkgenootschap. He wrote a large number of articles in the Weekblad voor het Recht and in Themis on commercial law, and was also a contributor to the Jaarboeken voor Israelieten in Nederland, signing his articles "N."

References

External links
 Van Nierop at Parliament.com

1813 births
1878 deaths
19th-century Dutch politicians
Jewish Dutch politicians
Members of the House of Representatives (Netherlands)
Members of the Provincial Council of North Holland